1894 Singapore Amateur Football Association Challenge Cup was the third season of the Amateur Challenge Cup, the predecessor of the Singapore Cup.

Two teams of the 10th Lincolnshire Regiment  met in the final, which wasn't settled throughout six replays. After the sixth replay, all 22 players names were entered into a hat, and 11 names were drawn out a hat to receive winners' medals, 8 of them from the second team and 3 from the first team.

Round 1

Semi-final

Final

Replay

Second Replay

Third Replay

Fourth Replay

Fifth Replay

Sixth Replay

References

Singapore - Singapore Cup tournaments - Additional Data 1892-1961, RSSSF.com

1894
1893–94 domestic association football cups
1894 in Singapore